Denis O'Callaghan was an Australian rugby league footballer who played in the 1960s.

O'Callagan played two seasons at St. George between 1968 and 1969. He was a utility player that often switched from the back row to the centres during his career.

Death
O'Callaghan died on 22 May 2017 at Tamworth, New South Wales.

References

1939 births
2017 deaths
St. George Dragons players
Rugby league centres
Rugby league second-rows
Australian rugby league players
Rugby league players from New South Wales